The Nokia Lumia 822 is a smartphone running Windows Phone 8 announced on 29 October 2012. It is exclusively available for Verizon customers. The device is a variant of Nokia Lumia 820. The Lumia 822 supports Qi standard induction charging and LTE connectivity.

History

Release 
During the Windows Phone 8 announcement on 29 October 2012, Steve Ballmer announced the release of the Lumia 822 alongside various other Windows Phone 8 smartphones, such as the HTC 8X and the Nokia Lumia 920. It is considered to be a carrier based variant of the Nokia Lumia 820, with some specific carrier variants, such as the support for LTE networks.
The Nokia Lumia 822 was actually released for sale on 15 November 2012.

On 18 February 2014, the Nokia Lumia 822 received the 'Black' firmware update (revision number 3051.40000.1352.0042), and it receive the 'DENIM' firmware update that introduces Windows 8.1.

Hardware 
Unlike the Lumia 920 and 820, the Lumia 822 has a different body design and shape. It comes in four different colors: Black, White, Gray, and Red (which launched on 24 January to commemorate Valentine's Day).

Processors, storage and memory 
The Lumia 822 features a Qualcomm Snapdragon S4 dual-core processor, clocked at 1.5 GHz, with 1 GB of onboard RAM.

There is 16 GB of internal storage, which is also expandable by MicroSD, up to 64 GB.

Screen 
The Lumia 822 features a Gorilla Glass 2-covered, 4.3-inch display at a WVGA (800×480) resolution. The screen utilises AMOLED display technologies, featuring Nokia's ClearBlack display technology. This adds a polarizing filter in the display to remove reflection of light from the screen to make blacks darker and deeper, improving contrast.

Camera 
Similar to the Lumia 820, the rear-facing camera features an 8-megapixel sensor with a f/2.2 Carl Zeiss Tessar lens. The rear-facing camera is also capable of shooting 1080p full HD video at 30fps. The front-facing camera has a resolution of 1.2 megapixels, allowing for videos at 720p.

Connectivity 
The Lumia 822 supports all of Verizon's CDMA and LTE bands. It also supports various GSM bands for world roaming purposes. It supports NFC, allowing for transfer of small files between phones. Other connectivity includes; Wi-Fi 802.11a/b/g/n, Bluetooth 4.0 and Micro USB.

Inductive charging 
Like its sibling phones, the Lumia 820 and 920, the 822 supports inductive charging through Qi technology. With this, it allows the phone to be placed on either a charging pillow or plate and be charged.

Reception 
Jessica Dolcourt from CNET wrote: "The Nokia Lumia 822 offers a very good value for Verizon, but if you're into stylish design and spotless call quality, this isn't the phone for you."

David Eitelbach from Laptopmag wrote: "The Lumia 822 makes a good first impression, but unfortunately the good vibes don't last as long as we'd like."

See also 

Microsoft Lumia

External links
 Official page
 Nokia developer - specifications
 Nokia Lumia 822

References 

Microsoft Lumia
Windows Phone devices
Mobile phones introduced in 2012
Discontinued smartphones
Videotelephony
Nokia smartphones
Mobile phones with user-replaceable battery

Nokia Lumia 822